TT       tubes tied

T          Testosterone 

Lists of medical abbreviations